Positive Money UK is a not-for-profit advocacy group based in London and Brussels. Positive Money's mission is to promote a fair, democratic and sustainable economy through reforms of central banks and alternative monetary policy. Its current executive director is geophysicist Fran Boait.

History 
Positive Money was founded in London by Ben Dyson in 2010 as a response to global financial crisis. In its early years, Positive Money focused its efforts in advocating for a fundamental reform of the United Kingdom's monetary system ("sovereign money system") and in raising awareness on the fact that the money creation process is mainly steered by the banking sector. 

In 2013, Fran Boait became executive director of Positive money. Under Boait's leadership, the organisation somehow broadened its scope and diversified its range of proposals, by including more pragmatic steps such as digital currency, and various forms of monetary financing proposals such as "People's QE" or "helicopter money", and "green quantitative easing". Positive Money also adopted new tactics such as rallies in front of the Bank of England and petitioning. In 2013, Positive Money initiated the International Movement for Monetary Reform, a worldwide network of likeminded organisations.

In 2015, Positive money  started its international expansion by launching a Eurozone-wide campaign on "Quantitative Easing for the People". Positive money registered as a lobby group in the EU institutions in Brussels  and in 2018 it formally created Positive Money Europe to operate the group's campaigns towards the European Central Bank and the European Parliament. In December 2019, Positive Money Europe was able to meet with the ECB President Christine Lagarde and its work has been praised by former ECB's chief economist Peter Praet.

In 2016 Positive money founder Ben Dyson joined the Bank of England as a researcher, and he continued to work on Central Bank Digital Currency.

Early 2021, Positive money won a major victory with the announcement that the Bank of England would be given the remit to green its corporate quantitative easing programme.

Proposals

Sovereign money 
Positive Money's historical backbone proposal is to introduce a "sovereign money system". Under such a reform, private banks would be deprived from their ability to create money by extending credit into the economy. In turn, the Bank of England would regain the monopoly over money creation, by financing the government's budget (monetary financing) or distributing a citizens' dividend ("helicopter money"). The group however refutes any affiliation with Modern Monetary Theory.

Although Positive Money's proposal is similar to full-reserve banking or narrow banking, it differs in the sense that it would merge bank deposits and central bank money. As explained by former Positive Money researcher Frank van Lerven, "Under a Sovereign Money system, there is no longer a split circulation of money, just one integrated quantity of money circulating among banks and non-banks alike." According to former ECB Vice-president Vitor Constancio, Positive Money's proposal "would not create enough funding for investment and growth."

Other proposals 
Over the years, Positive Money has broadened its agenda towards somewhat more short-term proposals such as:
 Fiscal-monetary cooperation: the organisation proposes various ways to channel money created by central banks towards public spending and investment.
 Reforming the governance and accountability frameworks of the Bank of England and of the European Central Bank.
 Greening monetary policy: Aligning monetary policy with climate change objectives though reforms of central bank's collateral framework or forms of credit guidance such as green TLTROs.
 Digital currency: the organisation propose implementing a central bank digital currency in the UK and supports the introduction of a digital euro by the ECB.

See also

2018 Swiss sovereign-money initiative
Chicago plan
Sustainable finance
Fractional-reserve banking
Helicopter money
Monetary financing
Monetary Policy
Monetary reform in Britain
Monetary reform
Money creation
People's Quantitative Easing

References

External links
 
 International Movement for Monetary Reform
 Sovereign Money Initiative (Switzerland)
 "Where Does Money Come From"

2010 establishments in the United Kingdom
Non-profit organisations based in England
Political and economic think tanks based in the United Kingdom
Lobbying organisations in the United Kingdom
Monetary reform